is a song by Japanese singer-songwriter Cocco, that was released as the lead single for her seventh original album, Emerald on June 9, 2010.

Writing

The song is a mid-tempo rock song, backed with Okinawan festival taiko drums. Nirai Kanai is a reference to the mythical utopia/origin of life in Ryukyuan religion. The song's lyrics reference this place, in the context of an Okinawan festival. The Dragon God of the sea is referenced, and the song also talks about how if good people exist in the world, bad people must also exist (in the lines "If there are praying people, there are also burning people" and "the rain also falls on criminals").

Cocco wrote the B-side, "Yagi no Sanpo," as a Christmas present to film director Ryūgo Nakamura, after he wrote her a letter expressing how much he enjoyed her music.

Promotion

"Nirai Kanai" was used as the ending theme song for the TV Tokyo music show Japan Countdown. "Yagi no Sanpo" was used as the theme song of then 14-year-old director Ryūgo Nakamura's debut feature-length film Yagi no Bōken.

Track listing

Chart rankings

Reported sales

References

External links
Victor "Nirai Kanai" product profile 

Japanese songs
2010 singles
2010 songs